Top Gun is a shoot 'em up combat flight simulation game based on the 1986 hit film Top Gun. It was developed and published by Konami for the Nintendo Entertainment System. It was released in the United States in November 1987, and then in Europe. It is an adaptation of VS. Top Gun, a 1987 Nintendo VS. System arcade game also by Konami. As the second game to establish the Top Gun game series, it was followed by Top Gun: The Second Mission. It is known for its extremely high difficulty.

Gameplay

Top Gun is a shoot 'em up combat flight simulation game, viewed from a first-person perspective inside the cockpit of an F-14 fighter plane. The game is based on the 1986 hit film Top Gun, and is played across four levels, each one involving the player fighting off enemy MiGs. In the second level, the player must also destroy an enemy aircraft carrier. For the final two levels respectively, the player's target is an enemy fortress and a space shuttle on a launch pad (the last mission occurs at night). The player has three lives in the form of F-14 planes. All three planes being destroyed yields game over with no continue.

The player has unlimited machine gun ammunition and three different types of missile, each one with their own advantages. MiGs also have their own missiles, which the player must avoid or destroy. The player is presented with onscreen information such as altitude, air speed, a radar, and a fuel gauge. Once during each level, the player can call in a tanker plane to refuel the F-14 if necessary. Refueling is done in mid-air, and the player must align the F-14 with the fuel pump. After each level, the player must successfully land the F-14 on a U.S. aircraft carrier.

Reception

Top Gun was a commercial hit. It was the top-selling game in the United States for two weeks in January 1988. By 1989, its sales had surpassed 1.8 million units in the United States, eventually reaching two million copies. Eugene Lacey of Computer and Video Games praised the graphics and sound, and was surprised by "the level of sophistication that the designers have achieved" with the gameplay considering the limited number of buttons on the NES controller. Lacey called it an "excellent" flight game addition to the NES library. The Games Machine stated that like most NES games, Top Gun had an emphasis on playability rather than graphical presentation. The magazine described the graphics as "little more than a detailed cockpit and fast moving enemies", but stated that the game succeeded in playability with its levels. The Games Machine added that the landing and refueling segments, and the necessary missile strategy, help to "spruce up the action".

Steve Jarratt of ACE praised the sound effects and wrote that Top Gun "is visually sparse but the sprites are extremely effective – especially in the air-to-air combat". Jarratt praised the large amount of "varied and entertaining" action, and stated that the game would appeal to fans of shoot 'em up games. German magazine Power Play criticized the gameplay's lack of playful variety. Ulrich Mühl of Aktueller Software Markt praised the graphics and sound. French magazine Player One said the graphics were good for an NES game.

Total! reviewed the game in 1993, and considered the gameplay too simplistic because the levels were too few and similar, but found variety in the landing and refueling segments. The magazine concluded, "While Top Guns a fun blast, it hasn't got any lasting pull." In a later review for the website AllGame, Christopher Michael Baker praised the graphics and realistic sound effects, and stated that it was arguably the best air warfare game ever released for the NES. However, Baker stated that it also offered much frustration with its difficulty. Baker cited three primary reasons for the difficulty, including the split-second decisions required in determining whether to avoid or destroy missiles, and the lack of continues. Baker also cited the landing and refueling segments, writing that they require "a soft touch and total concentration", and that they are "difficult, if not impossible, to master".

References

External links
 Top Gun at MobyGames

Arcade video games
Top Gun video games
Video games based on films
Nintendo Entertainment System games
Nintendo Vs. Series games
Konami games
1987 video games
Combat flight simulators
Shoot 'em ups
Video games set in Iran
Video games set in Kazakhstan
Video games set in the Soviet Union
Video games developed in Japan